Amritpal Chotu (died 17 February 2023) was an Indian Punjabi and Bollywood comedian and actor. He worked in many  Bollywood and Punjabi Movies.

Filmography

Punjabi

References

External links

Year of birth missing
20th-century births
2023 deaths
Indian male comedians
People from Punjab, India